Thiago Alves is the defending champion but lost in the quarterfinals to Gastão Elias.
Horacio Zeballos defeated Rogério Dutra da Silva 7–6(7–5), 6–2 in the final to win the title.

Seeds

Draw

Finals

Top half

Bottom half

References
 Main Draw
 Qualifying Draw

Aberto de Sao Paulo - Singles
2013 Singles
2013 in Brazilian tennis